The 2003 Supercopa de España was two-leg Spanish football matches played on 24 August and 27 August 2003. It contested by Mallorca, who won the 2002–03 Copa del Rey, and Real Madrid, who won the 2002–03 La Liga. Real Madrid won 4–2 on aggregate.

Match details

First leg

Second leg

References

Supercopa de Espana Final
Supercopa de Espana 2003
Supercopa de Espana 2003
Supercopa de España